Fame Is the Name of the Game is a 1966 American made-for-television drama film starring Tony Franciosa that aired on NBC and served as the pilot episode of the subsequent series The Name of the Game. It was directed by Stuart Rosenberg and was produced by Ranald MacDougall, who also wrote the teleplay, from the novel One Woman by Tiffany Thayer.

The film stars Tony Franciosa as investigative journalist Jeff Dillon and also presents the screen debut of 20-year-old Susan Saint James as Peggy Chan, Dillon's new editorial assistant. (In the series, St. James's character is renamed Peggy Maxwell, and she is the research assistant to all three of the rotating lead characters.) In the film, Jeff Dillon writes for Fame magazine, a publication of Janus Enterprises, and Glenn Howard (George Macready) is just the managing editor. In the subsequent series, Dillon writes for People magazine, a division of Howard Publications, and Glenn Howard (Gene Barry) is head of the whole company.

The telefilm also features Jill St. John, Jack Klugman, and Robert Duvall.

Plot
An investigative reporter looks into the murder of a call girl. His investigation unearths her diary, which has the names of many prominent people inscribed within its pages. He sets out to find her killer from among the names contained in the diary.

Cast
 Tony Franciosa as Jeff Dillon
 Jill St. John as Leona Purdy
 Jack Klugman as Ben Welcome
 George Macready as Glenn Howard (replaced by Gene Barry in the subsequent series)
 Jack Weston as Griffin
 Susan Saint James as Peggy Chan (Peggy Maxwell in the series)
 Lee Bowman as Cruikshank
 Robert Duvall as Eddie Franchot
 Jay C. Flippen as Dizzy Shaner
 Nicholas Colasanto as Lieutenant Lewis

Production

Advertising
In the weeks before the telefilm's first broadcast, NBC ran an unprecedented blitz of TV ads which erroneously billed Fame is the Name of the Game as television's first "world premiere" of a "major motion picture". The film garnered phenomenal ratings, leading to the spin-off series.

See also
 Chicago Deadline (1949)

References

External links
 

1966 films
1966 television films
Remakes of American films
American television films
Films with screenplays by Ranald MacDougall
Television films as pilots
1960s English-language films